The National D-Day Memorial is a war memorial located in Bedford, Virginia. It serves as the national memorial for American D-Day veterans. However, its scope is international in that it states, "In Tribute to the valor, fidelity and sacrifice of Allied Forces on D-Day, June 6, 1944" and commends all Allied Armed Forces during the D-Day invasion of Normandy, France on June 6, 1944, during World War II.

The memorial, bordering the Blue Ridge Mountains in southwestern Virginia, is an area of over  that overlooks the town of Bedford.  It officially opened on June 6, 2001, with 15,000 people present, including then-President George W. Bush.  About 60,000 people have visited the memorial each year. Of those, more than half are from outside of Virginia.

The "Bedford Boys" and the location of the memorial
Thirty-four Virginia National Guard soldiers from Company A, 116th Infantry Regiment, 29th Infantry Division, based in the town of Bedford prior to the war, were part of D-Day.  Company A was decimated within hours of landing, and nineteen of the men were killed during the first day of the invasion.  Four more died during the rest of the Normandy campaign.  The town and the "Bedford Boys" proportionately suffered the greatest losses of any American town during the campaign, thus inspiring the United States Congress to establish the D-Day memorial in Bedford.

The Bedford Boys included three sets of brothers: twins Roy and Ray Stevens, with Ray killed during the landing while Roy survived; Clyde and Jack Powers, with Jack killed and Clyde wounded but surviving; and Bedford and Raymond Hoback, both killed.  The losses by the soldiers from Bedford were chronicled in the best-selling book The Bedford Boys by Alex Kershaw, and helped inspire the movie Saving Private Ryan.  The movie's director, Steven Spielberg, helped fund the memorial, including funding for the creation of the Arnold M. Spielberg Theater, in honor of his father, a World War II veteran.

The National D-Day Memorial Foundation 

The National D-Day Memorial Foundation is a non-profit 501(c)(3)organization that had its beginnings as a small committee in 1988 with the prospect of building a memorial to dedicate the sacrifices made by the Allied Forces on D-Day.  The idea had been looked at, but support for its completion did not exist prior to the fiftieth anniversary of the invasion in 1994.

Presently, the foundation is headquartered in Bedford. After 8 months of 2 co-presidents, In May 2013, April Cheek-Messier was named the president of The National D-Day Memorial Foundation. It charges itself with expanding the memorial, such as when it listed on plaques the name of every one of the 4,413 Allied soldiers who died in the invasion, the most complete list of its kind anywhere in the world.  The memorial is currently trying to one better itself with its attempt to compile a list of every service member that participated in Operations Overlord and Neptune (Overlord was the code name of actual invasion whereas Neptune was code for getting the troops across the English Channel for the invasion).  The organization also involves itself in assisting veterans and their families such as undertaking the search for family members of soldiers whose personal belongings have been found after years of being lost.

Fundraising and building the memorial 

Fundraising and building the memorial took approximately seven years of planning and approximately $25 million to complete. In 1994, the town of Bedford donated  of land to the memorial. The foundation purchased additional acreage, bringing the total size of the memorial to 50+ acres.  In 1997, the foundation received a one million dollar donation from Charles Schulz, who, with his wife, volunteered to head a fundraising campaign for the memorial.

According to the National D-Day Memorial Foundation, the memorial is a continuum of three distinct plazas which follow on a time line. The first plaza, Reynolds Garden, symbolizes the planning and preparation activities for the invasion through the execution of the order for the invasion. It is in the shape of the Supreme Headquarters Allied Expeditionary Force combat patch. The second level, Gray Plaza, reflects the landing and fighting stages of the invasion. It includes what is called the invasion pool with beach obstacles in the water, sculptures of soldiers struggling ashore, and a representation of the Higgins craft used for the invasion. This section includes intermittent jets of water spurting from the pool replicating the sights and sounds of sporadic gunfire. The names of the United States' losses appear on the west necrology wall of the central plaza, the rest of the Allies' losses on the east necrology wall. In the spirit of Dwight D. Eisenhower's one-team command philosophy for the AEF, no other distinctions are made. The last and uppermost plaza, Estes Plaza, celebrates victory and includes the Overlord Arch and the twelve flags of those Allied nations that served in the Allied Expeditionary Force.

Tourism 
The memorial is open Sunday through Saturday 10:00 AM to 5:00 PM. During the months of January and February and part of March, the invasion pool is drained for maintenance. In addition to the memorial's static displays, on several weekends throughout the year, the memorial hosts events relating to remembering World War II.  Examples of such events have included a weekend long encampment of World War II re-enactors and a World War II-style religious mass in addition to Memorial Day, Veterans Day, and D-Day activities that occur annually.

See also
Imperial War Museum - London, England
List of national memorials of the United States
Marine Corps War Memorial - Arlington County, Virginia
Museum of La Coupole - German-built V-2 launch site in Pas-de-Calais, France
Museum of the War of Chinese People's Resistance Against Japanese Aggression - Beijing, China
Museum of The History of Ukraine in World War II - Kiev, Ukraine
Museum of World War II -  Natick, Massachusetts (Closed in September 2019)
Museum of the Great Patriotic War -  Poklonnaya Gora, Moscow, Russia
Museum of the Second World War - Gdańsk, Poland
National Museum of the Pacific War- in home of Fleet Admiral Chester Nimitz in Fredericksburg, Texas
National World War I Museum -  Kansas City, Missouri
National World War II Memorial -  National Mall, Washington, DC
United States Holocaust Memorial Museum - National Mall, Washington, DC
American Heritage Museum -  Stow, Massachusetts
The National WWII Museum - New Orleans, Louisiana

References 

Byron Dickson, Architect. The National D-Day Memorial: Evolution of an Idea. 104 pp.

External links
 National D-Day Memorial

Buildings and structures completed in 2001
Bedford, Virginia
National Memorials of the United States
Military monuments and memorials in the United States
World War II memorials in the United States
National Park Service areas in Virginia
Parks in Bedford County, Virginia
Monuments and memorials in Virginia
Tourist attractions in Bedford County, Virginia
2001 sculptures
Bronze sculptures in Virginia
Monuments and memorials on the National Register of Historic Places in Virginia
2001 establishments in Virginia
Operation Neptune